This is a list of all the personnel changes for the 2015 Indian Premier League. Apart from the players retained by their franchises, the rest entered the pool of players put up for auction. Notable names among these were Yuvraj Singh (released by Royal Challengers Bangalore), Pragyan Ojha & Zaheer Khan (released by Mumbai Indians), Kevin Pietersen (released by Delhi Daredevils) among others.

Trading window 
There were 2 trading windows prior to the auction which was held on 16 February 2015. A third trading window opened after the auction. During these trading windows, franchises could trade players with other franchises.

Retained players 
Prior to the auction, teams could release players and retain those that they wanted for the next season. The salaries of the released players would be added to the salary purse of the teams which was increased to Rs. 63 crores for the 2015 edition. The salaries of the retained players was deducted from this purse.

Auction

Summary 
66 players (43 Indians and 23 Overseas) were sold at the auction. Yuvraj Singh and Dinesh Karthik fetched the highest bids of  16 crore and   10.5 crore respectively. Angelo Mathews was the most costly foreign player at  7.5 crore. Many prominent players such as Kumar Sangakkara, Ross Taylor, Alex Hales, Cameron White and Tillakaratne Dilshan remained unsold at the auction.

Sold players 

Source:Pepsi IPL 2015 Player Auction

Withdrawn players
The following players withdrew from the tournament either due to injuries or because of other reasons.

Replacement signings
Players were signed as replacement of contracted players who were not available to play due to injuries and national commitments. Under IPL rules, the replacements have to be chosen from the pool of players who went unsold in the auction, and cannot be paid more than the players they are replacing, though they can be paid less.

References

External links
 IPL 2015 player salary

Indian Premier League personnel changes
2015 Indian Premier League
Cricket player auction lists